Annie Briard  is a Canadian intermedia visual artist based in Vancouver, British Columbia. Her video, photographic, and installation-based work explores the intersections of perceptual paradigms between psychology, neuroscience and existentialism, challenges the uncertain nature of perception itself, and memory.

Biography
Born in Montreal, Quebec, Briard attended Dawson College before earning a B.F.A from Concordia University in 2008 and an M.F.A in 2013 from Emily Carr University of Art and Design in Vancouver, Canada, where she currently teaches as a sessional instructor.

Select group exhibitions 

 WAVE POOL, Field Projects, NY Constructions 5 - Ruby's Mirages, and Paracosm M - The Sun Meets the Moon , stereoscopic photographs questioning and exploring the limits of our perception through buzzing illustrations of landscape and open ocean. 
 Artists Talk (2017), ebook, a guide for emerging as an artist. 
'L'instabilité du réel' (2019), Papier art fair, Monica Reyes Gallery, Montreal, curated by Thi-My Truong, touring exhibition across Quebec.

Select solo exhibitions 
 2017  Pop-Up Home, New Westminster Museum and Archives 
 2017  Paracosmic Sun, Back Gallery Project, Vancouver "The work in Paracosmic Sun projects and presents multiple temporal states simultaneously, states of seeing and not seeing, and also states where sight extends beyond the normal range or perception."
 2016  Staring at the Sun, Joyce Yahouda Gallery, Montreal In his review of the exhibition, art critic Edwin Janzen states that "for the visitor, a subtle questioning of sensory perception and reality is certainly the result."
2016  Vision Trouble, La Maison des Artistes, Winnipeg
2013  The Woods, VIVO Media Arts Centre, Vancouver "The psychology of agency and rebellious obedience are what comes to mind in engaging with this technological art piece."

Residencies 
In 2012, Briard completed a residency at the Banff Centre in Canada. In 2016, she completed an artist residency in Linea de Costa, Cadiz, Spain, in which she produced experimental works based on her research on how the human eye works. In 2017, she completed an artist residency at the AC Institute in New York, and in the following year, she completed two other residencies inESXLA, Los Angeles and in Samband íslenskra myndlistarmanna (SIM), Reykjavik.

Awards 
Briard's first award was the Bombardier Graduate Scholarship in 2012, given to her by the Social Sciences & Humanities Research Council, and in 2013 they awarded her with the Research for a Better Life Award. In 2016, Briard received a project grant from the Vidéographe, Programme de soutien à la création. In 2016 the British Columbia Arts Council awarded her with a Production grant in the visual arts, and in 2018 she received a second production grant from them for media arts. In 2018, the Canada Council for the Arts awarded her with an Explore and Create Production grant. Briard received travel grants from the British Columbia Arts Council in 2013 and 2017, and she received a Travel grant in 2012, 2014, 2016, 2018 from the Canada Council for the Arts.

References

Living people
21st-century Canadian photographers
Canadian women photographers
Artists from Montreal
Emily Carr University of Art and Design alumni
Concordia University alumni
Dawson College alumni
Year of birth missing (living people)
21st-century women photographers